Mo Mitchell may refer to:

 Little Mo Mitchell, a fictional character from the BBC soap opera EastEnders, played by Kacey Ainsworth
 Mo Mitchell (coach), head gymnastics coach at the University of Kentucky
 Mow Mitchell (1886–1980), American rugby union player